Vivian Lynette Gadsden is an American psychologist who is an education researcher at the University of Pennsylvania. Her research considers the social and cultural factors that affect learning and literacy. She is interested in intergenerational learning within African-American families.

Early life and education 
Gadsden was an undergraduate student at Fisk University in Nashville, Tennessee. She moved to the University of Michigan for graduate studies, where she completed a doctorate of education in adult literacy. Gadsden worked as a Spencer Foundation postdoctoral fellow.

Research and career 
Gadsden started her academic career studying educational psychology at Wayne State University. She moved to Washington, D.C. where she was made a research analyst in policy studies. She was appointed to the University of Pennsylvania Graduate School of Education (GSE) Literacy Research centre in 1988 and was made associate director in 1989.

Gadsden was made Director of the National Center on Fathers and Families in 1994. In 2006 she was made the William T. Carter Professor in Child Development and Education.

Gadsden's research considers the cultural and social factors that impact learning and literacy. In particular, she has focused on urban education and family literacy, and how this intersects with culture, race and gender. She is interested in how parents engage with their children's early literacy. Gadsden engages with Philadelphia's most vulnerable communities through the Penn Futures Project. During the COVID-19 pandemic, Gadsden studied the disproportionate impact of COVID-19 on the educational outcomes of students of color.

Gadsden seeks to improve the academic performance of students from underrepresented groups. She serves on the advisory boards of various school readiness initiatives and family literacy programs, and has provided expert advice to the United States Congress on children's reading. She served as the President of the American Educational Research Association in 2016. In 2021, she was made Chair-Elect of the University of Pennsylvania Office of the Faculty Senate.

Awards and honors 
 2017 Elected to the National Academy of Education
 2020 Edu-Scholar's top education scholars
 2020 Inducted to the Reading Hall of Fame

Selected publications

References 

University of Pennsylvania faculty
Fisk University alumni
University of Michigan alumni
21st-century American psychologists
Living people
Year of birth missing (living people)